Sergio Barış Gucciardo (born 19 April 1999) is a footballer who plays as a midfielder for Sportfreunde Lotte. Born in Germany, Gucciardo is a youth international for Turkey.

Early life 
Gucciardo was born to a Turkish mother and an Italian father; he grew up in Germany.

Gucciardo was loaned to Alemannia Aachen in July 2019, although one month later, it was announced that he would return to SC Paderborn 07. He was then loaned to SV Lippstadt 08.

Career statistics

References

External links
 

1999 births
Sportspeople from Freiburg im Breisgau
Living people
Turkish footballers
Turkey youth international footballers
German footballers
Turkish people of Italian descent
German people of Turkish descent
German people of Italian descent
Association football midfielders
SC Paderborn 07 players
VfL Bochum players
SV Lippstadt 08 players
VfR Aalen players
Sportfreunde Lotte players
3. Liga players
Regionalliga players
Oberliga (football) players